Eurico Ângelo de Oliveira Miranda (7 June 1944 – 12 March 2019) was a Brazilian politician and sporting director. He was president of Vasco da Gama from 2014 until 17 January 2018. He was previously president of Vasco da Gama between 2001 and 2008, having also previously worked in Vasco da Gama administration. He succeeded Antônio Soares Calçada in December 2000, and was reelected in December 2003 and December 2006. He was replaced by Roberto Dinamite in June 2008, however he returns to the presidency of Vasco da Gama in December 2014. He was also a federal deputy and known by his political approach characterised by Euriquism.

Vasco da Gama

He was a football advisor to the President of Vasco da Gama in 1980, and ran for club President in 1982, against Agarthyno Gomes and Antônio Soares Calçada, being defeated by the latter. He ran for President again in 1985 against Antônio Soares Calçada, being defeated again.

Eurico Miranda was the vice-president of Vasco da Gama football division between 1986 and 2000.

Controversy
In 1999, during a match between Vasco and Paraná Clube, he invaded the field, after three Vasco players were sent off by the referee, and prevented the match from being resumed. In 2000, he was accused by the Federal High Court (Supremo Tribunal Federal) of bearing responsibility for the São Januário collapse of a steel barrier, during the final match of the 2000 Campeonato Brasileiro final. Vasco da Gama won this match after defeating São Caetano.

Football Investigation Parliamentary Committee
In 2001, Eurico Miranda was the target of a series of press accusations, regarding several irregularities during his administration as vice-president, and later as president of Vasco. In that year, the Brazilian Congress convened its first investigative committee for football(a procedure known by the Portuguese acronym CPI), to investigate irregularities in the administration of Brazilian football, and Eurico Miranda was one of the people accused in the CPI's final report. A lawsuit was taken against him, but his abrogation was not approved. As Miranda was not re-elected deputy in 2002, he lost his parliamentary immunity and had several lawsuits filed against him.

Politics

He was the Progressive Party's federal deputy of Rio de Janeiro State between 1995 and 2002, being elected in the 1994 and 1998 elections. In 2002 and 2006, he was again Progressive Party's federal deputy candidate, but was not elected.

In 1990, he was the Liberal Party's federal deputy candidate, but was not elected.

Euriquismo 
 ("Euriquism") is a Brazilian politico-cultural phenomenon consisting of three dimensions: the principles of the philosophy of Eurico, the methodology of its application and the separated groups, although associated with CR Vasco da Gama not necessarily part of it, operating with him. It is necessary to took this three separated dimensions under a whole to fully understand the phenomenon.

References

Enciclopédia do Futebol Brasileiro, Volume 2 - Lance, Rio de Janeiro: Aretê Editorial S/A, 2001.

1944 births
2019 deaths
Brazilian football chairmen and investors
CR Vasco da Gama
Progressistas politicians
Liberal Party (Brazil, 1985) politicians
Members of the Chamber of Deputies (Brazil) from Rio de Janeiro (state)